Dashkasan is a cave complex.

Dashkasan may also refer to:
Dashkasan Rayon, administrative district in Azerbaijan
Daşkəsən, city in Azerbaijan
Daşgəsən, settlement in Azerbaijan
Dashkasan, Azarshahr, village in East Azerbaijan Province, Iran
Dashkasan, Isfahan, village in Isfahan Province, Iran
Dashkasan, Varzaqan, village in East Azerbaijan Province, Iran